Johann Stenglin, russified as Ivan Stenglin (Russian:  Иван Штенглин; c. 1710, Augsburg — c. 1777, St. Petersburg), was a German-born Russian mezzotint engraver.

Biography
He was born to the family of a wealthy burgher. Little more is known of him until 1741, when he accepted an invitation from the engraver and cartographer  to come to St. Petersburg and work at the newly established art department of the Russian Academy of Sciences. The first works he created there (mezzotints of Russian rulers) are now considered to be very crude. He was forced to leave the Academy in 1744, following some serious disagreements with its Director, Johann Daniel Schumacher, but was able to make a living as a freelance artist.

Around 1750, due to continued misunderstandings with the academic authorities, he left St. Petersburg for Moscow, where he painted portrait miniatures and lived in extreme poverty. In 1763 his old patron, Staehlin, found him and was able to obtain a room for him at the estate of the former Grand Chancellor, Alexey Bestuzhev-Ryumin. There, he once again produced engravings. When he had become reestablished, in 1765, Staehlin invited him back to St. Petersburg, where he taught mezzotinting at the now independent Imperial Academy of Arts. 

Most of his engravings are portraits; including those of Staehlin; the Danish Ambassador, ; the mathematician, Leonhard Euler; and the French adventurer, Jean Armand de Lestocq. Many of his original plates were purchased by the Academy or acquired by the collector, Dmitry Rovinsky. The Chancellery of the Academy of Sciences possesses eleven of his engravings of the Aurora Borealis over St. Petersburg, from sketches by Mikhail Lomonosov.

Sources

External links

Russian engravers
German emigrants to Russia
Imperial Academy of Arts
Portrait engravers
Artists from Augsburg
1710s births
1776 deaths
Year of birth uncertain